Tarnak Aw Jaldak, or Tarnak Wa Jaldak, is a district of Zabul province in southern Afghanistan.

Demographics 
It has a population of about 16,700 as of 2013. The district is mostly populated by the Nurzai Panjpai tribe of Durrani Pashtuns.

See also 
 Tarnak River
 Districts of Afghanistan

References 

Districts of Zabul Province